Phillips Ranch is a master-planned community, first developed by Louis Lesserin 1965. It is located in the southwestern portion of the city limits of Pomona, in Los Angeles County, California. It is located near the Pomona Freeway (SR 60), the Orange Freeway (SR 57), and the Chino Valley Freeway (SR 71). The zip code serving the neighborhood is 91766. Phillips Ranch is 4 miles southwest of downtown Pomona, and is mostly working to upper-middle class in a very diverse community. Many residents use "Phillips Ranch, CA" as a return address, which is an acceptable alternative to Pomona, CA, according to the United States Postal Service.  Phillips Ranch is often referred to by its neighborhood name instead of by the city name.

History

Phillips Ranch is located on land which served as part of the ranch of Louis Phillips, who in 1864 acquired the southern end of the  Rancho San Jose from two businessmen who had previously bought it from Ricardo Vejar. How much the very private Phillips’s fortune grew in these years is up for debate. In 1892, a reporter for the Pomona Progress interviewed Harris Newmark, who when asked, claimed unequivocally that the unassuming Phillips was the richest man in the county.

In 1964, Louis Lesser Enterprises, Inc. purchased Phillips Ranch, one of the largest parcels of undeveloped land in Los Angeles County, and developed 10,000 housing units.
Lesser purchased "the historic Phillips Ranch" southwest of Pomona in 1964, at 2.241 acres (9,070 m2) The sale of 5,000 acres (20 km2) of the ranch in 1875 started the City of Pomona. Lesser developed 10,000 housing units in this single project. The land was originally part of a 40,000-acre (160 km2) land grant from Mexico, Rancho San Jose, granted to Ricardo Vejar in 1837, who in 1864 sold to Prussian cowboy immigrant Louis Phillips, who came to California in the gold rush. Lesser's brother Alvin was his director of development at the time, and construction started in 1865. After the Civil War, the Southern Trail from the eastern United States, through Yuma, to the California coast passed through the ranch, and the Phillips Ranch Rubottom Hotel became a Saturday night wild west activity center, with fourteen saloons, and three opium dens for large numbers of settlers, businessmen, and others. Churches, schools, and Pomona College ended the lawless element.

Louis Phillips Mansion

The Phillips Mansion is a Second Empire-style historic house in Pomona, Los Angeles County, California. It was built in 1875 by Louis Phillips, who by the 1890s had become the wealthiest man in Los Angeles County. Situated along the Butterfield Stage route, the Phillips Mansion became a center of community activity in the Pomona and Spadra area. It was added to the National Register of Historic Places in 1974, making it among the first 25 sites in Los Angeles County to be so designated (there are now more than 450).

Geography

Phillips Ranch is bounded by the 71 Freeway to the east, Chino Hills to the south, Diamond Bar to the west, and Mission Blvd to the north-northwest. The elevation of the community is 800 feet above sea level, but it is as high as about 1400 feet, the peak being located at the northwestern part of the neighborhood above Mission Blvd.

City government

Steve Lustro was elected in November 2018 to represent District 5 seat.  Since moving to Pomona over 35 years ago, Steve's involvement in school and community has been virtually non-stop. Shortly after moving into his neighborhood, Steve was instrumental in helping set up a Neighborhood Watch group encompassing about 50 residences. This led to an invitation by a neighbor to serve on the School Site Council at Decker Elementary from 1984-1987. When Ranch Hills Elementary opened in 1990, Steve volunteered to serve as editor of the school newsletter, Rattlers' Tattler, which he continued to do for four school years.
In 1993, Steve was asked to participate as a community member on the planning advisory committee for Diamond Ranch High School. The committee, which met periodically until the school opened in 1997, was charged with helping select the site architect, determining when the school would open, and providing input on curriculum.
Steve was elected to the PUSD Board of Education in November 1997 and re-elected in November 2001. 
Steve was appointed to and served on the City of Pomona Planning Commission from July 1991 through April 1997.  In January 2017, Mayor Tim Sandoval selected Steve to serve as his appointment to the City of Pomona Board of Parking Place Commissioners (Vehicle Parking District), which is responsible for making policy recommendations and overseeing the operation of 26 City-owned parking lots in and around Downtown Pomona.

Education

Like the remainder of Pomona, Phillips Ranch is served by the Pomona Unified School District, which stretch as far south as parts of Diamond Bar. The community is served by two elementary schools: Decker Elementary School and Ranch Hills Elementary School.

Diamond Ranch High School is located on the hills where Diamond Bar and Phillips Ranch meet. In 2003 and 2007 Diamond Ranch was titled a California Distinguished School by the California Department of Education.  Pomona has been criticized for its construction of Diamond Ranch High School in the city's more affluent area of Phillips Ranch because of the inequities in the rest of the school district and for the almost $68 million tab for building this architecturally unique campus in the hilly area. However, the City of Industry provided $5.4 million, and sold 80 acres of an undeveloped hill land parcel for one dollar, for the school.

Higher education 
California State Polytechnic University, Pomona (Cal Poly Pomona), four-year university.
 Mt. San Antonio College, more informally called Mt. SAC, is in nearby Walnut, California.
 Western University of Health http://www.westernu.edu/

Main surface thoroughfares in Phillips Ranch
Rio Rancho Road
Phillips Ranch Road
Avenida Rancheros
Village Loop Road
Old Pomona Road
Temple Avenue
Santa Clara Drive
North Ranch Road
Mission Boulevard
Los Felis Drive
Chino Hills Parkway

References

External links
Phillips Ranch detail page
Pomona Unified School District's Home Page

Neighborhoods in Los Angeles County, California
Geography of Pomona, California